Laurie Gallagher (11 June 1924 – 12 December 2012) was an Australian rules footballer who played with Collingwood in the Victorian Football League (VFL).

Notes

External links 	
	
		
Profile on Collingwood Forever	

1924 births		
2012 deaths				
Australian rules footballers from Victoria (Australia)		
Collingwood Football Club players